Tripterodon orbis, the African spadefish, is a species of spadefish native to reefs along the Indian Ocean coast of Africa.  This species grows to a length of  TL.  This species is important to local commercial fisheries and is also popular as a game fish.  This species is the only known member of its genus.

References

External links
 Illustration

Ephippidae
Taxa named by Lambert Playfair
Fish described in 1867